Central Italy ( or just ) is one of the five official statistical regions of Italy used by the National Institute of Statistics (ISTAT), a first-level NUTS region, and a European Parliament constituency.

Regions
Central Italy encompasses four of the country's 20 regions:
 Lazio
 Marches (Marche)
 Tuscany (Toscana)
 Umbria

The southernmost and easternmost parts of Lazio (Sora, Cassino, Gaeta, Cittaducale, Formia, and Amatrice districts) are often included in Southern Italy (the so-called Mezzogiorno) for cultural and historical reasons, since they were once part of the Kingdom of the Two Sicilies and southern Italian dialects are spoken.

As a geographical region, however, central Italy may also include the regions of Abruzzo and Molise, which are otherwise considered part of Southern Italy for socio-cultural, linguistic and historical reasons.

Politics
Marches, Tuscany, and Umbria – together with Emilia-Romagna – are considered to be the most left-leaning regions in Italy, and together are also referred to as the "Red Belt".

Lazio, except for Rome, is more politically conservative, a trait which it shares with both Northern and Southern Italy.

Economy 
The gross domestic product (GDP) of the region was 380.9 billion euros in 2018, accounting for 21.6% of Italy's economic output. The GDP per capita adjusted for purchasing power was 31,500 euros, or 105% of the EU27 average the same year.

See also
 Italian NUTS level 1 regions:
 Northwest Italy
 Northeast Italy
 South Italy
 Insular Italy
 Northern Italy
 Southern Italy

References

Geography of Italy
NUTS 1 statistical regions of the European Union